The Crowd Goes Wild is a sports entertainment show broadcast on New Zealand nationwide television channel Prime TV. The show premiered on Monday 26 June 2006.

Created by former SportsCafe host and veteran journalist Ric Salizzo (who had served as executive producer and occasional presenter), The Crowd Goes Wild is presented by Andrew Mulligan (also one of the home team commentators for New Zealand Breakers), Storm Purvis, Taylor Curtis and  Wairangi Koopu with producer Ra Pomare.  The programme covers the sporting events of the moment in a lighthearted format and is broadcast live from the studios of Sky Television, combined with pre-recorded field items and clips. It airs Monday and Thursday nights across Prime and Sky Sport; prior to that, it aired five nights a week, Monday to Friday, at 7pm with Andrew Mulligan and Mark Richardson as co-presenters.

In late 2010 the show was moved from its live 7pm timeslot to 10:30pm, with the show being recorded at 6:30pm (and played at that time on Sky Sport 1). This move was unpopular, criticised by at least one commentator, and ultimately reversed.

In early 2011 the show was broadcast live at 6:30pm but moved back to its original 7pm timeslot in 2013. From 2021, the show only airs 4 days a week. From 2023, the team stops wearing a full brown suit as a uniform.

Field reporters include James McOnie, former All Black Josh Kronfeld, Rugby Union player Taylor Curtis, Rugby League star Wairangi Koopu, Winter Olympic athlete Anna Willcox-Silfverberg, and former Silver Fern Storm Purvis .

Presenters, reporters and producers
Andrew Mulligan – original presenter
Storm Purvis – presenter and reporter
Taylor Curtis – presenter and reporter
Wairangi Koopu – presenter and reporter
Josh Kronfeld – reporter
Tim Provise – reporter
Anna Willcox-Silfverberg – reporter
James McOnie – creative producer ('producer of big ideas'), reporter and occasional presenter
Ra Pomare  – producer
Matt Quin – executive producer

Former staff
Chris Key – reporter and occasional presenter
Cat Tuivaiti – reporter and occasional presenter
James Somerset – reporter – Feb 2008 to Nov 2013
Mark Richardson – original presenter – June 2006 to Dec 2016
Hayley Holt – reporter – Dec 2009 to Jan 2018
Meghan Mutrie – reporter – Jun 2011 to Nov 2013
Huw Beynon – producer, reporter and occasional presenter
Makere Gibbons – reporter
Ross McNaughton – producer
Ric Salizzo – series creator and executive producer

References

Prime (New Zealand TV channel) original programming
2006 New Zealand television series debuts
2000s New Zealand television series
2010s New Zealand television series
2020s New Zealand television series
New Zealand sports television series